OTB may refer to:

Arts
 On the Boards, an arts organization in Seattle, Washington
 Out of the Blue (American band), a jazz ensemble

Computing
 One True Brace, a software coding convention for formatting loops, functions, if statements, and blocks
 Orfeo toolbox, an open source library for remote sensing image processing
 OTA Bitmap, an image file specification for mobile phones (*.otb files)

Sports and games
 Off-track betting, sanctioned gambling on horse racing outside a race track
 Over-the-board, in chess, played on a single physical chessboard (as opposed to correspondence or online chess)
 Off the ball, in association football, a player's movement when not in possession of the ball

Other
 Off the boat, a slang phrase for newly arrived immigrants
 Overberg Test Range, or Overberg Toetsbaan, a missile test range in South Africa
 Overseas Trust Bank, a defunct bank of Hong Kong
 OTB Group, a holding company for several fashion brands
 The Old Timer's Bulletin an amateur radio history journal